Gary D. Koch (born November 21, 1952) is an American professional golfer, sportscaster and golf course designer, who formerly played on the PGA Tour, Nationwide Tour and Champions Tour.

Early years 
Koch was born in Baton Rouge, Louisiana in 1952, and raised in Florida.  He won the Florida Open in 1969 as an amateur at the age of 16.  He won the U.S. Junior Amateur in 1970. He attended C. Leon King High School in Tampa, Florida.  The 1969 King High golf team consisting of Koch, Eddie Pearce, Brian Hawke and Phil Reid won the Florida high school title setting a scoring record that stood for thirty years.

College career 
Koch accepted an athletic scholarship to attend the University of Florida in Gainesville, Florida, where he became a member of Sigma Alpha Epsilon Fraternity (Florida Upsilon Chapter).  While he was an undergraduate, Koch played for coach Buster Bishop's Florida Gators men's golf team in National Collegiate Athletic Association (NCAA) competition from 1971 to 1974.  As a Gator golfer, he was a four-time first-team All-Southeastern Conference (SEC) selection, and a three-time All-American.  He was also a member of the Gators teams that won SEC championships in 1973 and 1974 and an NCAA Championship in 1973.  Individually, he was a two-time medalist in the SEC tournament (1973, 1974), and the runner-up behind Ben Crenshaw at the 1973 NCAA championship tournament.  His Gators teammates included fellow future PGA Tour professionals Woody Blackburn, Andy Bean, Phil Hancock and Andy North.  Koch graduated from Florida with a bachelor's degree in journalism in 1976, and was inducted into the University of Florida Athletic Hall of Fame as a "Gator Great" in 1978.

Professional career 
Koch turned professional in 1975, and won six events as a professional on the PGA Tour during the 1970s and 1980s.  His career year in professional golf came in 1984 when he finished seventeenth on the money list and captured two titles: the Isuzu-Andy Williams San Diego Open and the Bay Hill Classic.

In preparation for play on the Champions Tour, Koch played some on the Nationwide Tour in his late 40s.  After turning 50 in November 2002, he began play on the Champions Tour.  His best finish in this venue was a tie for second at both the ACE Group Classic and Liberty Mutual Legends of Golf in 2004.

Post-professional career 
Koch's career as a sportscaster began in 1990 with ESPN working Champions Tour telecasts. Before the end of the decade, he joined NBC Sports. A long-time member of the NBC Sports announcing team (1996–present), he is best known for his "Better than Most" call in the third round of the 2001 Players Championship at the TPC at Sawgrass. Three down from leader Jerry Kelly, Tiger Woods was facing a long, triple-breaking, fringe putt for birdie on the 17th hole's famous Island Green. Koch's call of that putt has gone down as one of the most famous in golf history as it was during the height of Tiger's dominance, on an iconic hole of a well-known course, on the way to an inevitable, yet routine Woods comeback to win the tournament.

Koch also maintains an interest in golf course design and helped design the front nine of "The Forest" course at The Eagles Golf Course in Odessa, Florida. Koch was inducted into the Florida Sports Hall of Fame in 2012. Koch currently resides in Tampa, Florida.

Golf courses (original design)
Bardmoor Golf and Tennis Club
Mill Creek
Mission Inn Resort & Club, Las Colinas course
Mystic Dunes Golf Club
The Eagles Golf Club, Forest course
The Groves Golf & Country Club

Amateur wins 
this list may be incomplete
1970 U.S. Junior Amateur
1973 Trans-Mississippi Amateur

Professional wins (10)

PGA Tour wins (6) 

*Note: The 1988 Panasonic Las Vegas Invitational was shortened to 72 holes due to weather.

PGA Tour playoff record (2–0)

Other wins (1) 
1969 Florida Open (as an amateur)

Senior wins (3)
2003 Liberty Mutual Legends of Golf – Raphael Division (with Roger Maltbie)
2008 Liberty Mutual Legends of Golf – Raphael Division (with Roger Maltbie)
2009 Liberty Mutual Legends of Golf – Raphael Division (with Roger Maltbie)

Playoff record
Japan Golf Tour playoff record (0–1)

Champions Tour playoff record (0–1)

Results in major championships 

CUT = missed the half-way cut
"T" indicates a tie for a place

Summary

Most consecutive cuts made – 5 (twice)
Longest streak of top-10s – 1 (four times)

U.S. national team appearances
Amateur
Walker Cup: 1973 (winners), 1975 (winners)
Eisenhower Trophy: 1974 (winners)

See also 

Fall 1975 PGA Tour Qualifying School graduates
List of Florida Gators men's golfers on the PGA Tour
List of Sigma Alpha Epsilon members
List of University of Florida alumni
List of University of Florida Athletic Hall of Fame members

References

External links 

Golf With Gary: Biography

American male golfers
Florida Gators men's golfers
PGA Tour golfers
PGA Tour Champions golfers
Golf course architects
Golf writers and broadcasters
Golfers from Louisiana
Golfers from Tampa, Florida
Sportspeople from Baton Rouge, Louisiana
C. Leon King High School alumni
1952 births
Living people